Jean Joffre (1872–1944) often styled simply as Joffre was a French film and stage actor.  A character actor he played a variety of supporting roles in theatre and the cinema during his career. His final screen appearance was in the 1943 film The Count of Monte Cristo.

Selected filmography

 The Little Cafe (1919)
 Les Trois Mousquetaires (1921)
 My Aunt from Honfleur (1923)
 Le Miracle des loups (1924)
 Education of a Prince (1927)
 When Love Is Over (1931)
 The Dream (1931)
 Moonlight (1932)
 The Three Musketeers (1932)
 L'Aventurier (1934)
 Little Jacques (1934)
 The Assault (1936)
 Samson (1936)
 Culprit (1937)
 Marthe Richard (1937)
 Abused Confidence (1938)
 Adrienne Lecouvreur (1938)
 Rasputin (1938)
 Orage (1938)
 Behind the Facade (1939)
 The End of the Day (1939)
 Thérèse Martin (1939)
 The Phantom Wagon (1939)
 Beating Heart (1940)
 Narcisse (1940)
 The Black Diamond (1941)
 The Benefactor (1942)
 The Count of Monte Cristo (1943)

References

Bibliography
 Crisp, Colin. French Cinema—A Critical Filmography: Volume 1, 1929-1939. Indiana University Press, 2015.
 Goble, Alan. The Complete Index to Literary Sources in Film. Walter de Gruyter, 1999.

External links

1872 births
1944 deaths
French male film actors
French male stage actors
people from Pyrénées-Orientales